The  is a commuter electric multiple unit (EMU) train type operated by the private railway operator Hanshin Electric Railway in Japan since 2001.

Design 
The design was based on the earlier 9000 series trains, formed as six-car sets. The motored cars are mounted on SS144 bogies, and the non-powered trailer cars use SS044 bogies. Upon introduction, it was the first trainset to feature perpendicular seating since the 3011 series from 1954 - the first in 47 years.

This is the last train to be built by Mukogawa Sharyo Kogyo. The manufacturer went out of business in 2002.

Operations 
The 9300 series sets have been operating on direct express services on the Hanshin Main Line since March 2001.

Formations 
, the fleet consists of three six-car sets, numbered 9301, 9303, and 9305. Odd-numbered cars are at the Umeda end while even-numbered cars are at the Sannomiya end.

The three six-car sets are formed as shown below, with four motored "M" cars and two non-powered trailer "T" cars.

Each M car (the middle two cars) are fitted with one single-arm pantograph.

Interior 
Seating in the end cars consists of longitudinal seating throughout. In the intermediate cars, seating consists of longitudinal seating on the car ends. Between the car doors, seating is arranged in a 2+2 configuration.

References 

Electric multiple units of Japan
9300 series
Train-related introductions in 2001
1500 V DC multiple units of Japan
Mukogawa Sharyo rolling stock